Burvill is a surname. Notable people with the surname include:

Cliff Burvill (1937–2021), Australian cyclist
Glenn Burvill (born 1962), English footballer
Margaret Burvill (1941–2009), Australian athlete

See also
Burvall
Alice Burville